KMFO-LP (98.1 FM) is a low-power FM radio station licensed to Tulsa, Oklahoma, United States. The station is currently owned by Oklahoma Jazz Hall of Fame, Inc.

History
The station call sign KMFO-LP on June 5, 2014.

References

External links

MFO-LP
MFO-LP
Jazz radio stations in the United States
Radio stations established in 2017
2017 establishments in Oklahoma